Ojara Martin Mapenduzi is Ugandan journalist, politician and member of the Parliament representing Gulu West (Bardege-Layibi Division). He previously served as the Chairman of the Gulu District Local Government.

Early life and education 
Ojara was born in a family of 18 children. He received his Bachelor of Education degree from Gulu University, and taught literature at Gulu Central School as a part-time teacher. Thereafter he began practicing journalism working with Choice FM in Gulu and rose to the position of News Editor and Program Manager in two years.

Political career 
Ojara became active in politics in 2006 when he contested and won councillorship seat for Bardege Ward in Gulu Municipality and became speaker of the house. In 2013, he was elected Chairman of the Gulu District local council where served until 2021 when he was elected to the national parliament from Gulu West. In the parliament, he was appointed Chairperson,Local Government Accounts committee by the major opposition party in the parliament, National Unity Platform, NUP.

References 

Ugandan journalists
Gulu University alumni
Members of the Parliament of Uganda
Year of birth missing (living people)
Living people